Jonathan Allan "Jody" Stecher (born  June 1, 1946) is an American singer and musician. He is best known as a  bluegrass and old time musician, playing banjo, mandolin, fiddle and guitar and two of his albums with Kate Brislin have been finalists for the Grammy Award for Best Traditional Folk Album.  He also plays sursringar (a relative of the sarod) in the Dagar gharana tradition of dhrupad.

Early life
Jonathan Allan Stecher was born on June 1, 1946, in Brooklyn, New York. At the age of twelve he found a dusty fretless Gatcomb banjo in an antique shop and bought it for two dollars. After gaining a solid grounding in bluegrass, cajun, blues and Scottish folk music, he studied Hindustani classical music for 3 years with Ali Akbar Khan and for 10 years with Zia Mohiuddin Dagar.

Musical career
He has collaborated with Krishna Bhatt on an unusual album of fusion music, Rasa (1982). He met Kate Brislin (a former member of Any Old Time String Band) in 1974, and they started performing actively as a duo in 1985; they married on 29 July 1987. He is regarded as one of the leading traditional folk artists in America, and his recordings have served a large and diverse group of musicians, including Jerry Jeff Walker, Jerry Garcia, David Grisman, Peter Rowan, Martin Simpson, Seldom Scene, Laurie Lewis, Kathy Kallick, Alasdair Fraser and Hot Rize. He has also written liner notes for many albums.

He recorded the field recordings (with Peter K. Siegel) and wrote the liner notes for the record The Real Bahamas.

David Bromberg once said, "Jody Stecher was basically my teacher. He opened my ears to more beautiful music than anyone else ever did... more than I ever knew existed. He is also one of my favorite musicians on Earth to play with. I have never known anyone so intensely and completely enveloped in music. It's my suspicion that if you drained all the music out of Jody, you could carry what was left around in an eye dropper."

Jody has been twice nominated for a Grammy with his wife Kate: in 1993 for Our Town (Best Traditional Folk Album), and again in 1998 for Heart Songs: The Old Time Country Songs of Utah Phillips (Best Traditional Folk Album of 1997). More recently he has devoted albums to singing traditional folk songs.

Jody Stecher's sister, Janet Stecher, is a professional singer in the duo Rebel Voices and leads the Seattle Labor Chorus.

Discography

Solo albums
 Snake Baked a Hoecake (1974)
 Going Up on the Mountain (1977)
 Oh the Wind and Rain (1999)
 Wonders & Signs (2012)
 Dreams from the Overlook, 2 CDs (2020)

With Krishna Bhatt
 Rasa (1981)

With Kate Brislin
 A Song That Will Linger (1989)
 Blue Lightning (1991)
 Our Town (1993)
 Stay Awhile (1995)
 Heart Songs: The Old Time Country Songs of Utah Phillips (1997)
 Songs of the Carter Family (2000)
 Return (2010)

With Alasdair Fraser
 The Driven Bow (1989)

With Bob Black, Chris Brashear, Peter McLaughlin, Ed Neff, and Forrest Rose
 Perfect Strangers (2003)

References

External links
 
Dawgnet
Appleseed
Interview
Secret Life of Banjos
Interview from Utsav 2006, Seattle
Z. M. Dagar: a Memoir by Jody Stecher
Award & Pictures from Union Grove Fiddler's Convention 1967
Award & Pictures from Union Grove Fiddler's Convention 1968
Jam Session Photo from Union Grove 1968

American folk musicians
American folk singers
American male singers
1946 births
Living people
Fingerstyle guitarists
Claddagh Records artists